Edwards Center Inc. (founded 1972 in Oregon by author Dr. Jean Edwards), is a private, nonprofit organization serving adult Oregonians with developmental disabilities with 20 locations in both Washington County and Clackamas Counties.

History 
1972 - Jean Edwards, a University of Oregon graduate with a passion for special education founds the Edwards Center and makes a promise to six families that the fledgling center would take care of their children once the parents were gone.

1975 - Oregon passes legislation allowing developmentally disabled children access to public schooling—the Individuals with Disabilities Education Act. Dr. Jean Edwards opens the first group home in Washington County housing disabled adults in the community.

2012 - Edwards Center provides resources, homes, jobs, and recreational opportunities for over 300 Oregonians with disabilities.

2013 - According to the Oregon Department of Human Services' Seniors and People With Disabilities, the number of people with developmental disabilities receiving in-home services has climbed from just under 2,000 to 9,000 between 2001 and 2010. Allen Cress, (executive leader of Edwards Center Inc.), begins a building project at the Edwards Community Center in Beaverton, Oregon - a pocket neighborhood of ten homes which offers a unique care model for families. The facility provides families a community, allowing parents to age in place with their children – then takes over permanent care of the children, with caregivers available on an as-needed basis, costing a fraction of what it takes to hire an in-home care provider.

2014 - The "Tree of Life" campaign begins for the Edwards Center and includes the Tree of Life benefit concert series, held twice a year at the Edwards Aloha Community Center, as well as recordings and music videos which document stories of adults surmounting the challenges of Developmental Disabilities. Performers at the live concert series and recordings feature internationally acclaimed Oregon musicians and artists and include Esperanza Spalding, Gino Vannelli, Tom Grant, Oregon Poet Laureate Paulann Petersen, Janet Chvatal and Marc Gremm. The series is sponsored by the Fournier Insurance Group.

2015 - Two homes are completed at the Community Center in Beaverton. Edwards Center Inc. establishes a partnership with Meals on Wheels and Washington County Disabled, Aging, and Veteran's Services to serve lunches to seniors and veterans providing new community connections for several groups that might otherwise become isolated.

See also
 Independent Living
 Timeline of disability rights in the United States
 Janet Chvatal
 Meals on Wheels

References

Sources
 Edwards, Jean Parker. We are people first, our handicaps are secondary. Foreword by Robert Perse. Photography by John Stewart. Portland, Or. Ednick, c1982. 90 pages. Dewey 362.4/06/01.
 Edwards, Jean Parker. Sara and Allen: the right to choose. 2nd Edition. Portland, Or. Ednick, c1976. 85 pages. Dewey 362.386.

External links
 
 Tree of Life website

Charities based in Oregon
1972 establishments in Oregon
Disability organizations based in the United States